Baron Colebrooke, of Stebunheath in the County of Middlesex, was a title in the Peerage of the United Kingdom. It was created in 1906 for Sir Edward Colebrooke, 5th Baronet. He held several positions at the British court. The Colebrooke family descended from the London banker James Colebrooke. His second son James Colebrooke represented Gatton in the House of Commons. On 12 October 1759 he was created a baronet, of Gatton in the County of Surrey, in the Baronetage of Great Britain, with remainder to his younger brother George. He was succeeded according to the special remainder by his younger brother George, the second Baronet. He was Member of Parliament for Arundel and also served as Chairman of the Honourable East India Company.

On Colebrooke's death the title passed to his second but eldest surviving son, the third Baronet. He died childless and was succeeded by his nephew, the fourth Baronet. He was the son of Henry Colebrooke, an administrator in India and Sanskrit scholar, third son of the second Baronet. Colebrooke represented Taunton, Lanarkshire and North Lanarkshire in Parliament. He was succeeded by his eldest son, the fifth Baronet, who was elevated to the peerage in 1906. Lord Colebrooke had no surviving male issue and on his death in 1939 both the baronetcy and barony became extinct.

Robert Colebrooke, elder brother of the first and second Baronets, sat as Member of Parliament for Maldon.

Colebrooke baronets, of Gatton (1759)
Sir James Colebrooke, 1st Baronet (1722–1761)
Sir George Colebrooke, 2nd Baronet (1729–1809)
Sir James Edward Colebrooke, 3rd Baronet (1761–1838)
Sir Thomas Edward Colebrooke, 4th Baronet (1813–1890)
Sir Edward Arthur Colebrooke, 5th Baronet (1861–1939) (created Baron Colebrooke in 1906)

Barons Colebrooke (1906)
Edward Arthur Colebrooke, 1st Baron Colebrooke (1861–1939)

References

Attribution

Extinct baronies in the Peerage of the United Kingdom
Noble titles created in 1906